Jonathan Cope may refer to:

Jonathan Cope (dancer) (born 1963), principal dancer with The Royal Ballet
Jonathan Cope (MP for Stafford) (died 1694), MP for Stafford
Sir Jonathan Cope, 1st Baronet (died 1765), MP for Banbury
Sir Jonathan Cope, 4th Baronet (died 1821), of the Cope baronets

See also
Cope (surname)
John Cope (disambiguation)